Carrier Air Wing Fifteen (CVW-15) is a former United States Navy aircraft carrier air wing that was decommissioned on March 31, 1995. It was previously known as Carrier Air Group Fifteen (CVG-15) before 1963 before being renamed in December of that year.

History

Early Years and Vietnam War 
The squadron was made up of reserve squadrons during the two cruises during the Korean War. Starting in 1960, CVG-15 would begin a two decade long attachment with the  that would continue when in 1963, all CVGs were re-designated as Carrier Air Wings. With this, CVG-15 became Carrier Air Wing 15. CVW-15 however did deploy with the  only once in 1966 during the Vietnam War. During the evacuation of Saigon in 1975, CVW-15's aircraft covered the helicopters used to rescue the civilians fleeing the Invasion.

Post Vietnam 
CVW-15 made their final deployment on board the Coral Sea in 1977. This cruise was the only time that the F-4J Phantom and EA-6A Electric Intruder part of CVW-15.

In 1983, CVW-15 deployed on the new Nimitz-class carrier 's first post-shakedown cruise. This cruise was significant as it was an around the world cruise that involved stops in St. Thomas, Monaco, Abidjan, Perth, Subic Bay, British Hong Kong, Sasebo, Pusan, Pearl Harbour and the moving the Vinson's homeport from Norfolk, Virginia on the west coast to Alameda, California, in the San Francisco Bay Area. During their time with the Carl Vinson, they took part in RIMPAC 84' and 86'. During the 1986-to-1987 cruise in the North Pacific, VF-51 and VF-111 carried the multiple tail codes of other carrier air wings to confuse Soviet Naval Aviation patrols which carrier VF-51 and 111 was assigned to.

In July 1988, during the Olympics in Seoul, CVW-15 embarked on board Carl Vinson and operated off the coast of South Korea. In 1989, they also took part in the large naval exercise PACEX 89.

Post Cold War and Final years 
In 1990, CVW-15 made their last cruise with the Carl Vinson before moving back to the Kitty Hawk for the rest of their remaining service in the US Navy. This cruise was also the last cruise for the A-7 Corsair in CVW-15 before VA-27 and VA-97 converted to the F/A-18A as well for the SH-3H Sea King which was replaced by the SH-60F Oceanhawk/HH-60H Rescuehawk in the case of HS-4.

On January 13, 1993, VFA-97's CDR. Kevin J. Thomas led a night air strike of 110 coalition aircraft, including 35 aircraft from the Kitty Hawk, against Iraq SAM Command and Control sites in Southern Iraq. This in response to Iraqi violations of U.N. resolutions. On the 18th, an airstrike made of 29 aircraft including F/A-18As and F-14As and E-2Cs in support from CVW-15 was called off when Iraq moved mobile SAM sites into Southern Iraq.On the 23rd, another incident occurred when Iraqi AAA fired on an A-6E SWIP Intruder from VA-52 and two F/A-18As from CVW-15 over Southern Iraq. In response, the Intruder attacked the AAA site with a 1,000 pound bomb.

Between June and December 1994, CVW-15 made their last deployment before being inactivated in 1995 along with many squadrons that were part of CVW-15. During that deployment, the air wing participated in the "first anti-submarine warfare prosecution of Chinese Han class sub contact" as well as the tracking of the larger Oscar II Class Submarine between July 7 and 8, of which were designed to attack American Carrier Battlegroups. The Oscar II Submarine was most likely the K-442 of the Russian Pacific Fleet.

References

Carrier Air Wings
Military units and formations disestablished in 1995
United States Navy